Irek Ishmukhametovich Yalalov  (born on 27 January 1961), is a Russian politician who is currently a member of the Federation Council from the legislative body of state power of the Republic of Bashkortostan since 2018.

Biography

Irek Yalalov was born in Ufa on 27 January 1961. He is of Bashkir ethnicity.

On 29 September 2018, Yalalov became a member of the Federation Council.

Criticism

On 8 October 2016, Yalalov said: "Snow will not be removed from the city this winter, as the budget is not designed for this," for which he was criticized by the townspeople and the media. However, the republican authorities did not allocate the necessary funds for the purchase of snowplows. At the beginning of the winter of 2017, Yalalov had to respond to criticism for not removing snow from the roads. The following winter, Yalalov personally supervised the snow removal process, and complaints from the townspeople were minimized.

On a direct line in April 2017, Rustem Khamitov criticized the administration of Yalalov for critical rapprochement with business and attracting the attention of law enforcement agencies: “We have already had quite serious conversations with the head of the city and are still to come. If the situation does not improve, we will take other measures." - said the head of the republic.

In July 2017, Yalalov responded to the criticism leveled at the city administration for the flood that occurred in the city after rain due to the inefficient operation of stormwater.

Political scientist Dmitry Mikhailichenko assessed the information work of the city administration as unsatisfactory: “PR specialists often exacerbate the situation with their statements in social networks and in the media. At the same time, they do not have diversified channels of interaction with the population. For example, such a PR tool as grassroots (initiative of the masses) is practically not used. The pool of loyal and effective bloggers, which are extremely important for working in social networks, has not been formed."

Family 
He is married and has two children.

References

1961 births
Living people
21st-century Russian politicians
United Russia politicians
Mayors of Ufa
Members of the Federation Council of Russia (after 2000)
Bashkir people